O Deza is a comarca in the northeast corner of the Galician Province of Pontevedra. It covers an area of 1,024.7 sq.km, and had an overall population of 42,511 at the 2011 Census; the latest official estimate (as at the start of 2018) of 40,063.

Municipalities

The camarca is composed of the following 6 municipalities:

References

O Deza